The S&DR George England 2-4-0 were  steam locomotives built by George England for the Somerset and Dorset Railway (S&DR) and its predecessor, the Somerset Central Railway (SCR). There were frequent re-numberings, which explains the presence of two number 11s.

Tender engines built 1861-1864

Notes
 Built for Somerset Central Railway
 Engines sent to Fox, Walker and Company in 1874 were in part-exchange for new 0-6-0ST locomotives

Two of the engines sent to Fox, Walker were re-sold to the Bishops Castle Railway.

Tank engines built 1861

Tender engines built 1865
These were double-framed engines built to the design of James Cudworth for the South Eastern Railway (SER). By the time they arrived, the SER no longer required them, so they were sold to the S&DR instead.

See also
 Locomotives of the Somerset and Dorset Joint Railway

References

Somerset and Dorset Joint Railway locomotives
George England and Company locomotives
2-4-0 locomotives
Railway locomotives introduced in 1861
Standard gauge steam locomotives of Great Britain